Lacépède's ground snake (Erythrolamprus cursor) is a species of snake in the Colubridae family. It is endemic to Martinique. Little is known of it scientifically, and few photographs exist.

Geographic range
It has been reported on Diamond Rock (Rocher du Diamant), which may be the last refuge for the species.

Taxonomy
The French naturalist Bernard Germain Étienne de la Ville, Comte de Lacépède first described it in 1789 in his Histoire Naturelle des Quadrupèdes Ovipares et de Serpens.

Behavior
The snake is diurnal and lives on the ground, usually hidden under leaves and wood. It hunts reptiles and amphibians.

Conservation status
The importation to Martinique of other species of snakes, and of mongooses to control them, have driven it to near extinction.

References

External links
 Breuil, M. 1996.  Erythrolamprus cursor.   2006 IUCN Red List of Threatened Species.   Downloaded on 28 July 2007.

Further reading
Lacepède, B.G.E. 1789. Histoire Naturelle des Quadrupèdes Ovipares et de Serpens. Vol. 2. Paris: Imprimerie du Roi, Hôtel de Thou. 671 pp. (Coluber cursor, p. 96.)

Erythrolamprus
Endemic fauna of Martinique
Reptiles of the Caribbean
Reptiles described in 1789
Taxa named by Bernard Germain de Lacépède
Taxonomy articles created by Polbot